Harold Howell Lewis (25 October 1910 – 2006) was a Welsh footballer who played as an inside forward for Rochdale, Southend United, Notts County, West Ham United, Swansea Town and Queen of the South. He was also on the reserve team of Arsenal.

References

Rochdale A.F.C. players
Southend United F.C. players
Notts County F.C. players
West Ham United F.C. players
Swansea City A.F.C. players
Queen of the South F.C. players
Arsenal F.C. players
Footballers from Merthyr Tydfil
Welsh footballers
Association football forwards
1910 births
2006 deaths